This article details features of the Opera web browser.

Currently supported features 
Access recently closed pages Opera allows its users to retrieve all of the tabs or windows closed earlier in the current session from a list. Closed tabs can be recovered in the reverse sequence in which they were closed, by default this is achieved via the keyboard shortcut Ctrl + Shift + T. Users can also access recently closed tabs from other devices synced to their Opera account, including tablets and phones.
Opera 7, released 28 January 2003

Download manager Opera allows its users to pause, resume, or restart the transfer of files. It also keeps the history of downloaded files and allows opening the files—or the folder where the file has been downloaded to—from within the browser. When a download begins, a pop-up and a button will appear at the top-right area of the interface to show the download progress.

Extensions Extensions allow users to easily add functionality to their Opera browser, as well as share most APIs with the Chromium extension model. Developers can easily create extensions using open standards (HTML5, CSS, JavaScript) and specific extensions can be created to function as Speed Dial items.
Opera 11, released 16 December 2010

Image loading setting Opera offers the option to load a page without images, or to use only images already in the web cache. This may be useful for users who are connected on dial-up via modem or on a slow wireless/cellular connection that may charge for the amounts of data downloaded.

Mouse gestures Opera was one of the first browsers to support mouse gestures, which allows patterns of mouse movement to trigger common browsing actions, such as "back" or "refresh". Mouse gestures work by holding the right mouse button, moving the mouse a certain direction, then releasing the button. This option is similar to using keyboard shortcuts, as it saves time since users do not have to navigate to graphical buttons using the mouse pointer (thereby avoiding usability problems relating to Fitts' Law).

Some of the default mouse gestures include:

 Back—right-clicking anywhere and dragging the mouse towards the left.
 Forward—right-clicking anywhere and dragging the mouse towards the right.
 New tab—right-click and dragging down.
 Close tab—right-click and making an L-shape movement (drag down, then right).
 Zooming—holding down the CTRL key and scrolling the mouse wheel. Scrolling up enlarges the page by 10% increments, and vice versa.
 Rocker gestures (i.e., flip back and forward)—hold the right-click mouse button and click left, and vice versa.
Opera 5.10, released April 2001

Opera Turbo When Opera Turbo mode is enabled, Opera compresses requested web pages (but not HTTPS secure pages) by up to 80%, depending upon content, before sending it to the user. This process reduces the total amount of data sent and is particularly useful with slower internet connections, making pages load faster, or when there are restrictions or costs dependent upon the amount of data transferred. This technique is also used in Opera Mini for mobile telephones.

Around April 2019, Opera removed this functionality in its desktop browsers and it's no longer supported on desktop. The fate of it on its mobile browsers is uncertain.

Page zooming Opera offers full page zooming. Instead of just making the text bigger, this feature expands all page elements, including text, images, videos, and other content such as Adobe Flash, Java and Scalable Vector Graphics to be increased or decreased in size (25% to 500%). Extensions may also be used to do this and to enable high contrast coloured fonts. Full page zooming prevents inconsistencies that occur when regular text enlargement forces the content to be bigger than its container. Zooming can be done using multi-touch pinching gestures on supported platforms.

Password manager Each time a web page includes a password form, users have the option to store that password for later use. With the password manager, when a user re-visits these pages, the username and password fields will be already filled in.

Pop-up blocking Opera allows its users to control whether web sites may open pop-up windows. By default, Opera blocks all unrequested pop-ups and the behavior may be set on a per-site basis. Windows that have been blocked may be later opened at the user's discretion.

Private browsing Opera's privacy mode, Private Windows, allows users to surf the web without leaving traces of the browsing session in that special window.

Opera's original privacy feature, Private Tabs, allowed users to open a private browsing session in a tab in the current window, instead of a separate window. It would not record browsing history, use the web cache, or stored passwords, and would forget any information accessed in the Tab when it is closed. This feature was replaced by Private Windows in Opera 15.
Opera 10.50 (Tabs) / Opera 15 (Windows)

Safer address field Opera applies domain highlighting; hides query strings in order to conceal the complexity of long web addresses; and, instead of displaying the protocol, Opera displays a badge that the user can click on to view a security assessment—including information about available SSL or TLS certificates—for the particular page being visited.:
This tool is directly tied to NetCraft and Phishtank, thereby serving as a phishing filter as well as real-time fraud protection.

Search engines Opera provides quick access to a variety of search engines and commerce sites, via the use of search plugins. The user can type the search string in the address field and it will display search suggestions for supported websites. Many search plugins are included with the browser, but they can also be user-defined or installed from external sources. Since Opera 9, a user can right-click a search field on a website and select the "create search" option to add it as a custom search engine. Additionally, with this function a user is able to translate a paragraph or look for the meaning of a word directly for example.

The user can select the desired search engine via a list or by using keywords in the address field. Example: Opera has a pre-set keyword for using the Google search engine: "g". Therefore, if a user types "g wikipedia" directly into the address field, Opera performs a Google search for "wikipedia". Other keywords are included, including "b" for Bing, "y" for Yahoo! Search, and "w" for Wikipedia. Users can also customize their own keywords.
Opera 4, released 28 June 2000

Snapshot tool Opera 49 added a screenshotting tool with editing features, including a selfie mode.
Opera 49

Speed Dial Browsing When a new tab is opened, the blank page is replaced with a page with slots that the user can set to contain webpage bookmarks. This feature is based on the speed-dial browsing previously introduced in Opera Mini. New versions of Opera's Speed Dial improved the feature by allowing an unlimited number of speed dial entries, Speed Dial extensions, introducing groups, real-time search of entries, added support to user-defined backgrounds and different resolution display layouts (e.g. widescreen).

Users are able to save all the tabs in a window as a Speed Dial group, manage the saved links, and open them all later if wished.
Opera 9.2, released 11 April 2007

Standalone installation Opera's installer allows users the option to install the browser as a "Standalone Installation (USB)," which does not make any modifications to the system that it is executed on.
Opera 11, released 16 December 2010

Tabbed browsing Opera supports tabbed browsing, which allows for multiple web pages to be opened within the same application window. The tabs can be managed in a tab bar (opening, closing, rearranging, etc.). The user is given options to perform actions such as cloning a tab with its complete history or pinning it. Notably, the part of the tab which displays a page's favicon is used as the indicator of the page loading progress. Also, open tabs can be previewed by hovering your mouse above the tab. This can be disabled through the settings menu.
Opera 4, released 28 June 2000

Task Manager As Opera is based on Chromium, the Chromium-Browsing-Task Manager, as known from Google Chrome, is also a part of Operas range of features. This is not part of the legacy features of Opera 12.17.

VR player Opera is the first web browser to provide support for 360-degree videos to be played directly into virtual reality headsets.

}

Legacy features 

Many notable features, there were available in older versions of the Opera web browser, were removed when Opera switched from its legacy layout engine, Presto, to the Chromium-based Blink engine. Presto was introduced in 2003 (Opera 7) and was used until Opera 12.18, in 2016.

Search engine aliases Typing an alias in the "omnibar" (combination of address and web search bar) such as g , yt  and w  prior to the search string launches a search using Google, YouTube and Wikipedia respectively.

BitTorrent Opera provides the ability to transfer files via a built-in BitTorrent client.
Opera 9, released 20 June 2006

Bookmarks In Opera 15, the classic bookmark functionality was supplanted by an improved Speed Dial and the introduction of the Stash feature. Many users did not find this to be adequate, and bookmarks returned in a later version:

Content blocker Content-blocking can be used to block any content on a page, including images, plug-ins (e.g., Flash), videos, scripts, styles, and other resources. To block content, a user must right-click on the page, and click "Block Content". It is then possible to simply select the elements one wishes to block. Users can also control how much they want to block expand using URL's with wildcards and such.

Opera stores its content-blocking URL list in a file called urlfilter.ini. Several internet sites provide a regularly updated urlfilter.ini already loaded with the web's most common advertisements so users can block ads using the built-in feature. The users are able to sync the content blocker list using Opera Link.

Customization Users have the option of defining the appearance and functionality of every item on the UI with the exception of the minimize, maximize/restore, and exit buttons. Personal preferences for toolbar buttons and menus can be arranged with drag and drop, while access to .ini files allows one to create, define, or redefine buttons, menus tools and functions.

Skins: Opera supports customized user-interface skins, allowing users to change the style and size of toolbars, buttons and menus. A drag and drop functionality allows the user to easily place links and buttons on toolbars. The user is able to install custom skins, ranging from color changes to OS mimics to animated GIF images.

Toolbars: Opera provides toolbars that display different menus and buttons. For example, the "start" toolbar is a drop-down toolbar which can be enabled to provide access to history and bookmarks when the user focuses the address field. Additionally a "view" toolbar includes multiple shortcuts to control the page exhibition and a find in page tool, a "navigation" toolbar can show commands to navigate through webpages, etc.

Developer tools Dragonfly is a debugging tool—similar to Firebug and developer tools found in other browsers—that allows debugging of the HTML DOM, JavaScript, CSS, and more. A user can set breakpoints and watches, alter scripts on-the-fly, execute statements in the current environment from a console, and audit page resources and local storage. Opera Dragonfly also allows debugging from a personal computer a webpage opened on a handheld or other device.

Dragonfly is written using standard web technology and the Scope protocol, and source is available under the Apache License 2.0. Opera Dragonfly is compatible with Opera products using Presto 2.1 and later. The first stable version of Opera Dragonfly was released on 5 May 2011.
Opera 9.5, released 2008

Fit to width Opera provides a fit-to-width feature that relies on technology similar to Opera Mini's Small Screen Rendering (SSR), allowing websites to fit within a smaller screen resolution without the need for horizontal scrolling.

Full text history search Words typed in the address field perform full-text search in the browser history. This allows a user to find a page previously accessed by searching by part of the text of its content.
Opera 9.5, released 12 June 2008

Hotclick Hotclick refers to double-clicking any word in a page and having it to open the context menu instantly, which in Opera includes commands for searching the selected text in search engines and built-in translation, encyclopedia and dictionary services. In addition to this, the Hotclick menu also gives access to the 'copy', 'copy to note' (Opera 7 and later), and 'Send by email' functions.
Opera 6, released 18 December 2001

Opera Panels Some tools relating to browsing and email functions are organized within Opera Panels. Users can add additional tools by downloading or creating their own. Examples of tools installed by default:

 Bookmarks—lists all the bookmark folders and the bookmarks they contain.
 Mail serves as access point for email accounts, folders, labels and news feeds.
 Contacts—email address book.
 History—provides a log of all pages accessed.
 Links—list of links available in the current page.
 Notes—displays all the notes folders and the notes they contain, it allows the user to edit pure text notes.
 Info—displays page-specific information, including its MIME type, local cache, size, security information, and encoding.
 Windows—provides management for all the tabs and windows open.
 Transfers—simplified view of the download manager.

Privacy and security Opera can be configured to use proxy servers, and has a built-in cookie editor and web cache viewer. Also, the password manager integrated into the browser allows users to set a master password to protect against unauthorized tampering or access to stored passwords. Users have full control over data supplied to the W3C Geolocation API.

Tooltips Tooltips, which users have the option to disable, are small info boxes that displayed some additional relevant information. Some of Tooltips features include:

 Displaying the file size and the progress of the page that was loading
 Hovering the mouse cursor above buttons on the address bar would provide some information, inside of a small box, about that button's purpose. For some buttons, it would also display a combination of keystrokes, that one would have to press to execute the same action.

Usability and accessibility Opera was designed to run well even on low-end and small computers, and with a commitment to computer accessibility for users who may have visual or mobility impairments.

It is possible to control all main functions of the browser using only the keyboard, and the default keyboard shortcuts can be modified. Opera also supports the use of access keys to allow a computer user to immediately jump to a specific part of a web page via the keyboard.

Discontinued features 
BB-Code-Keystrokes A user was able to make a text bold, italic and underlined by adding [B][I][U]-tags around the selected text through keyboard shortcuts. If no text was selected, the text would appear where the mouse was.

Mouse gestures (some) Opera used to offer some mouse gestures that are no longer available in the latest version as of now. These include:

 Scroll through tabs — hold right mouse button and roll wheel to cycle through the open tabs.
 Clone tab — right-click, drag down then up

Opera Link ;Opera Link allowed users to synchronise their bookmarks, Speed Dial, notes, personal bar, custom search engines, typed history, and the content-blocker list across multiple computers and mobile devices (such as a copy of Opera Mini running on a mobile phone). Furthermore, the bookmarks, notes, and Speed Dial could be accessed through a web interface.:
Opera Link servers left users with only a month to backup their bookmarks one by one, before the feature was discontinued in 2015. User data synchronization support was set to return in a later release, though users on Symbian, J2ME and BlackBerry would not have access to it.
Opera 9.50, released 12 June 2008.
14 December 2015

Opera Mail In addition to the web browser, the other main component in the desktop versions of the Opera suite is the Opera Mail email client, which was integrated with the Opera browser until version 12. Opera Mail supports regular POP and SMTP mail as well as IMAP. It also has an Address book. Opera Mail also features a newsreader and a newsfeed reader for RSS and Atom, as well as an IRC client for online chat. (RSS Reader/News Client now available is modern opera)
Opera 2
Opera 12

Private Tabs Opera's Private Tabs were introduced in Opera 10.50, allowing users to open a private browsing session in a tab in the current window, instead of a separate window. Private Tabs would not record browsing history, use the web cache, or stored passwords, and would forget any information accessed in the Tab when it is closed.

This feature was replaced by Private Windows in Opera 15.
Opera 10.50
Opera 15

Sessions Opera allowed users to save all the open tabs and windows as a session. This set of pages could then be reopened later as they were previously organized or inserted into the current window. Opera could then also be set up to start with one of the saved sessions. A saved session includes the history of each tab and the settings each one had, such as scrolling position, images on/off, etc.

Since version 32 this feature can only be achieved with a combination of Speed Dial and Bookmarks, or more elegantly by installing a session-manager extension.
Opera 4, released 28 June 2000
Opera 32, released September 2015

Tabbed browsing features Tabbed browsing features that were available in the older versions include:

 MDI: tabs can be resized, moved, tiled, and cascaded like normal application windows in the operating system.
 Tab-stacking - Since version 11.0, dragging one tab over another allows a user to create a group of tabs.
 Option to have the tab bar displayed on one of the sides of the window or at the bottom. This feature is set to return in an upcoming version.

User JavaScript Opera supported User JavaScript (UserJS) extensions, which would execute JavaScript when pages were loaded in order to enhance site functionality. UserJS.org, which is currently inactive, was the unofficial central repository for Opera User JavaScripts. Scripts designed for the Greasemonkey Firefox extension are listed on Userscripts.org, though many of them also work with Opera. As of the latest version, extensions can make up for the need for UserJS.
Opera 8, released 19 April 2005

Widgets Opera Widgets were small standalone applications sitting on the desktop that used the browser's rendering engine. Widgets were phased out starting with Opera 12.

Opera 12

Other
 Save browsing history forever until manual deletion. (Chromium-Based browsers do erase old history automatically)
 Show page loading progress in the address bar (Size; Percentage; Number of loaded and total elements).

Compatibility 
Common compatibility problems are caused by websites not following standards or using methods for detecting the browser being used. To cope with outdated detection methods or poorly built websites, Opera enables users to change the information that is sent to websites to identify what kind of browser is being used—known as the user-agent. In previous years, Opera came preconfigured to partially "cloak" itself as Internet Explorer, but still included the word "Opera" in the user-agent information allowing the browser to be counted in web browser statistics. As websites modernized themselves and Opera 9 became more compatible with IE code, Opera began to use its own identification by default.

Later versions of Opera offered a limited method of cloaking allowing selection from a pre-defined range of options including Mozilla and Internet Explorer. If needed, Opera can mask completely as Internet Explorer or Mozilla, leaving out the reference to Opera in the UA string and JavaScript objects. Some sites test only for objects that are not present in Opera.

The version 8 of Opera introduced a further provision for dealing with faulty coding, by providing a set of scripts in BrowserJS that rewrites known broken pages as they are being opened. The closely related UserJS (similar to Mozilla's Greasemonkey), allows users to run their own code at various times in the processing of a page. These techniques have allowed many popular but incompatible sites to be used fully with Opera.

Opera periodically updates itself with the latest version of BrowserJS and override_downloaded.ini files to keep more sites working correctly in the browser, respectively, they serve to patch websites which would otherwise have issues to run on Opera and to cloak the UA string by default for some website domains.

References 

Opera
Opera Software
Web browsers
Computer accessibility